Cris Alexander (born Allen Smith, January 14, 1920 – March 7, 2012) was an American actor, singer, dancer, designer, and photographer.

Early life and education 
Cris Alexander was born in Tulsa, Oklahoma, in 1920. He began using the name Christopher, which he thought more distinguished, in his teens. On the advice of a spiritualist, he removed the "h" and went by Cris from then on.

Alexander attended the University of Oklahoma while working as a radio announcer in Oklahoma City. He moved to New York City in 1938 to study at the Feagin School of Dramatic Art.

Acting
Alexander was cast as Chip, a naive sailor, in the original Broadway cast of Leonard Bernstein's On the Town in 1944. He performed the song "Come Up to My Place" in a duet with Nancy Walker in the role of Hildy. He returned to Broadway in 1946 in Present Laughter opposite Clifton Webb.

In 1953, Alexander was cast in Wonderful Town, another Bernstein musical, with Rosalind Russell. He played drugstore manager Frank Lippencott, performing the comic song "Conversation Piece." Alexander stayed with the musical for its entire run. He moved next into performances for Mame, again with Russell. He played store manager Mr. Loomis, a role he repeated in the 1958 film version titled Auntie Mame.

Alexander's last acting role was in Lanford Wilson's 1966 play The Madness of Lady Bright. He continued to be involved in theatrical productions and created projection slides for the 1970 production of Richard Rodgers's Two by Two.

Photography

Alexander also had a career as a photographer, and opened a photo studio in the late 1930s when he first moved to New York City. He was noted for his portraits of celebrities and performers, many of whom were his personal friends. He worked as chief photographer at Andy Warhol's Interview magazine, and as the official photographer for the New York City Ballet.

He contributed hundreds of original and altered photographs to two of Patrick Dennis's best selling books. Little Me, a mock biography documenting the life of fictional actress Belle Poitrine, features more than 150 of Alexander's photographs. It featured photos of his partner Shaun O'Brien, and would become a camp classic. Alexander also wrote the novel's preface. Dennis's First Lady: My Thirty Days at the White House told the story of Martha Dinwiddie Butterfield, wife of a fictional robber baron president.

Personal life 
Alexander became involved with New York City Ballet dancer Shaun O'Brien in the 1940s, beginning a relationship that would last nearly 60 years. The couple retired to upstate New York in 1993, and married in 2011 when same-sex marriage became legal in New York State. Cris Alexander died in Saratoga Springs in 2012.

Film roles
The Littlest Angel (1969) – Raphael
Auntie Mame (1958) – Mr. Loomis
Wonderful Town (1958) TV – Frank Lippencott

References

External links

Cris Alexander at the International Center of Photography
Obituary

American male film actors
American male stage actors
American photographers
1920 births
2012 deaths
Musicians from Tulsa, Oklahoma
American gay actors
American gay musicians
American LGBT photographers
LGBT people from Oklahoma
Artists from Tulsa, Oklahoma
Male actors from Tulsa, Oklahoma
University of Oklahoma alumni
21st-century American LGBT people